Grumman Duck may refer to:
 Grumman JF Duck, a single-engine amphibious biplane
 Grumman J2F Duck, an improved version of the earlier JF Duck